The 2014 FIBA Under-17 World Championship for Women (Czech:Mistrovství světa FIBA žen do 17 let 2014)was an international basketball competition held in Klatovy and Plzeň, Czech Republic, from 28 June to 6 July 2014. It was the third edition of the Under-17 Women's World Championship.

Slovakia were to originally host the championship, but its national federation was suspended by the FIBA Central Board on 7 April. The Slovakian team still participated provided they meet the conditions imposed by FIBA. On 26 May, the FIBA Central Board lifted its suspension, and the national team can still participate. The tournament would still be hosted by the Czech Republic, though.

The United States successfully captured their third title in a row by defeating Spain, in a rematch of the last edition's final, 77–75 in the final.

Qualification
16 teams were qualified for this edition:

2013 FIBA Africa Under-16 Championship for Women

2013 FIBA Asia Under-16 Championship for Women

2013 FIBA Americas Under-16 Championship for Women

2013 FIBA Europe Under-16 Championship for Women

The Czech Republic was awarded hosting duties on 7 April after the Slovakia Basketball Federation was suspended by the FIBA Central Board.

2013 FIBA Oceania Under-17 Championship for Women

Host nation

Slovakia's hosting duties were stripped on 7 April in favor of the Czech Republic when their national federation was suspended. The team's participation was pending the result of the suspension. FIBA lifted the suspension on 26 May, therefore allowing Slovakia to compete.

Preliminary round
The draw was held in Bratislava, Slovakia on 26 February 2014.

Group A

|}

Group B

|}

Group C

|}

Group D

|}

Final round

Round of 16

9th–16th place playoffs

9th–16th place quarterfinals

13th–16th place semifinals

9th–12th place semifinals

15th place game

13th place game

Eleventh place game

Ninth place game

5th–8th place playoffs

5–8th place semifinals

Seventh place game

Fifth place game

Championship

Quarterfinals

Semifinals

Third place game

Final

Final standings

Awards

All-Tournament Team
 Ángela Salvadores
 Katie Lou Samuelson
 Joyner Holmes
 Virág Kiss
 Debora Dubei

Statistical leaders

Points

Rebounds

Assists

Blocks

Steals

References

External links
Official website

2014
2014 in women's basketball
2013–14 in Czech basketball
International women's basketball competitions hosted by the Czech Republic
International youth basketball competitions hosted by the Czech Republic
Sport in Plzeň
2014 in youth sport